Christoph Gutknecht (born 24 March 1939) is a German linguist, author, and a voice actor. He was a professor of English studies from 1972 to 2001 at the University of Hamburg.

Academic career 
Gutknecht studied German studies, English studies, philosophy, and education at the University of Hamburg, Germany. He received a PhD for his linguistic thesis Die mittelhochdeutsche Versnovelle 'Von zwein koufmannen' des Ruprecht von Würzburg about the work in Middle High German by Ruprecht of Würzburg in 1966.

From 1972 until 2001, Gutknecht was a professor for English studies at the University of Hamburg. He has been specialising in the fields of applied linguistics, Yiddish, and translatology.

Voice actor 
Gutknecht has been working as a voice actor since the 1980s by taking part in various audiobooks, audio plays and dubbing of movies. He also spoke the role of "Loghain Mac Tir" in Dragon Age: Origins in 2009.

Publications (selection) 
 Christoph Gutknecht: Vorbei an Ächtung und Zensur. Zur Rolle literarischer Anspielungen in erotischem Schrifttum. Geheimsprachen Verlag 2020, .
 Christoph Gutknecht: Gauner, Großkotz, kesse Lola: Deutsch-jiddische Wortgeschichten. be.bra 2016, .
 Christoph Gutknecht: Ich mach’s dir mexikanisch. Lauter erotische Wortgeschichten. C. H. Beck 2004, .
 Christoph Gutknecht: Lauter blühender Unsinn. Erstaunliche Geschichten von Aberwitz bis Wischiwaschi. C. H. Beck 2002, .
 Christoph Gutknecht: Lauter spitze Zungen. Geflügelte Worte und ihre Geschichte. C. H. Beck 1996, .
 Christoph Gutknecht, Lutz J. Rölle: Translating by factors. State University of New York Press 1996, .
 Christoph Gutknecht: Lauter böhmische Dörfer. Wie die Wörter zu ihrer Bedeutung kamen. C. H. Beck 1995, .
 Christoph Gutknecht: Contributions to applied linguistics. Lang 1975, .
 William J. Barry, Christoph Gutknecht: Practical Englisch phonetics. A programmed course in English pronunciation. Buske 1971, .

References

External links 
 
 Christoph Gutknecht's profile on ResearchGate

1939 births
Living people
Male actors from Hamburg
Writers from Hamburg
Linguists from Germany
German male non-fiction writers
University of Hamburg alumni
German male voice actors
Academic staff of the University of Hamburg